Isaac Kaye is a businessman with interests in healthcare and politics in the United Kingdom. Originally from South Africa, he obtained Irish citizenship upon his arrival in the UK in 1985.

Healthcare
Kaye built Norton Healthcare Ltd., a UK generic pharmaceutical company, which was acquired by Ivax Corporation in 1990. He became chairman of Ivax Pharmaceuticals UK. In 2006 Ivax was sold to Teva Pharmaceuticals for $7.4 billion.

In 2002 Ivax was the largest supplier of generic drugs to the NHS.

Kaye was also a co-founder of Israel Healthcare Ventures, an Israel-based venture capital firm, and also established the Kaye Innovation Awards in order to encourage and recognize technological achievements at the Hebrew University of Jerusalem

Politics
In January 2008 his name was listed as one of the donors to Peter Hain's May 2007 election campaign for the deputy leadership of the Labour Party. Kaye's donation of £15,000, undeclared as a donation by Hain at the time, was channelled through the Progressive Policies Forum organization. Kaye, along with David Garrard, sponsors the annual lunch of the Labour Friends of Israel.

References

British businesspeople
Labour Party (UK) people
Labour Friends of Israel
British Jews
Living people
Year of birth missing (living people)